MeasuringWorth is a free online service to calculate relative economic value over time using price indexes. It has data sets, charts, and comparators for prices in several currencies and economic time series for stock markets and the price of gold. The site's comparisons over time were used in over 200 academic works each year in 2018 and 2019.

Services 
MeasuringWorth.com has calculators offering measures of the price of gold since the year 1257, comparisons of the British pound sterling to the U.S. dollar since 1791, and other "comparators." Such conversions make implicit assumptions about opportunity costs, and how the potential buyers and sellers would have used their resources given the available alternatives. Therefore there are multiple comparators for the United States, the United Kingdom, Australia, and Spain. The site also hosts essays and academic papers on the subject of long-term comparisons of economic value.

History 
The site spun off from online comparators at EH.net, the Economic History Association's web site, which continues to host several of the relevant data sets. Economic historians founded the service in 2006 and since 2019 the site is owned by the not-for-profit MeasuringWorth Foundation.

See also
 Price indexes
 Purchasing power
 Measuring economic worth over time

References 

Economic history
History of money
Macroeconomic indicators
Internet properties established in 2006
2006 establishments in the United States